Vanjinapuram is a village in the Sendurai taluk of Ariyalur district, Tamil Nadu, India.

Demographics 

As per the 2001 census, Vanjinapuram had a total population of 2798 with 1391 males and 1407 females.

References 

Villages in Ariyalur district